Galindo Garcés (died 844) was a Count of Aragón from 833 until his death in 844, the son and successor of García Galíndez (count of Aragón 820–833).

He left no known descendants, and the county returned to the hands of the dynasty his father had displaced, in the person of Galindo Aznárez I, who was previously Count of Urgell (830–833), Cerdanya (c. 830 – 833), Pallars (833–834), and Ribagorza (833–834). It has been speculated that nobleman Velasco Garcés, who defected from Pamplona in 842 to join Abd ar-Rahman II, might have been Galindo's brother, and that this may have contributed to the dynasty's replacement following Galindo's death.

|-

844 deaths
Counts of Aragon
Year of birth unknown